is a women's football club playing in Japan's football league, the Nadeshiko League Division 1. Its hometown is the city of Nagoya, Aichi.

Squad

Current squad
As of 2 May 2022.

Results

Transition of team name
Nagoya FC Ladies : 1998 -2011
NGU Nagoya FC Ladies : 2012 – 2016
NGU Loveledge Nagoya : 2017 – Present

References

External links 
 NGU Loveledge Nagoya official site
 Japanese Club Teams

Women's football clubs in Japan
Association football clubs established in 1991
1991 establishments in Japan